Kents Hill is the name of more than one location
 Kents Hill, Milton Keynes is a district in Milton Keynes, England.
 Kents Hill, Maine is an area in the state of Maine, United States of America

See also
 Kents Hill School, Maine